László Tharnói-Kostyál (25 May 1912 – 15 July 1997) was a Hungarian writer. His work was part of the literature event in the art competition at the 1936 Summer Olympics.

References

1912 births
1997 deaths
20th-century Hungarian male writers
Olympic competitors in art competitions
People from Nové Mesto nad Váhom